Feldhoff is a surname. Notable people with the surname include:

Jochen Feldhoff (born 1943), German handball player
Markus Feldhoff (born 1974), German footballer and manager

German-language surnames